LaVall Jurrant Jordan (born April 16, 1979) is an American college basketball coach, most recently the head coach for the Butler Bulldogs. He is a former head coach of Milwaukee, as well as assistant coach at Michigan, Iowa, and Butler.  In six seasons as an assistant coach under Michigan head coach John Beilein, Michigan advanced to the NCAA tournament each year except 2015, won Big Ten Conference regular season championships in 2012 and 2014 and appeared in the Elite 8 in 2014 and  the National Championship in 2013.

Playing career 
Jordan played for Butler from 1998 to 2001. He helped lead the team to three Midwestern Collegiate Conference (now Horizon League) tournament titles and two regular-season championships while also playing in four consecutive postseason tournaments — three NCAA (1998, 2000, and 2001) and one NIT (1999). Butler also won its first NCAA Tournament game in 39 years with a 79–63 win over Wake Forest in 2001. He was a two-time All-Conference player and the 2001 Midwestern Collegiate Conference men's basketball tournament MVP.

Jordan played professional basketball in Europe for one year after graduating. He was the first Butler player to participate in the NBA Development League, playing for the Huntsville Flight.

Coaching career

Assistant at Butler and Iowa 
Jordan spent four years (2003–07) on Todd Lickliter's staff at Butler before following him to Iowa for three additional seasons (2007–2010).

Assistant at Michigan 

Under coach John Beilein at Michigan, Jordan's focus was on recruiting and developing back court players along with defensive strategies, scouting, and on-court coaching. Jordan is often given credit in greatly aiding in the development of Michigan's guards, especially point guards. During the time he spent there, Trey Burke, Tim Hardaway Jr. and Darius Morris all played under Jordan. As a member of the coaching staff, Jordan helped Michigan to five NCAA Tournament appearances, including two trips to the Elite Eight and one to the National Championship Game in 2013.

Head coach at UW-Milwaukee 
On April 7, 2016, Milwaukee hired Jordan to replace Rob Jeter. In his first year as a head coach with the 2016–17 Milwaukee Panthers, the team finished with an 11–24 record, but it made an improbable run in the 2017 Horizon League men's basketball tournament, becoming the first 10th-seeded team to win a Horizon League tournament game, and going on to reach the championship game against Northern Kentucky. Had they won, they would have set a record for the team with the most losses reaching the NCAA Division I men's basketball tournament.

Head coach at Butler
On June 12, 2017, Butler hired Jordan to replace Chris Holtmann. Butler's athletic director Barry Collier had recruited Jordan as a player and coached him for three seasons. In his first season as head coach, he led the unranked Bulldogs to a stunning 101–93 upset of No. 1 Villanova in Hinkle Fieldhouse, marking Butler's third straight win over the Wildcats.

On April 1, 2022, Butler announced that they had parted ways with Jordan.

Personal life
Jordan is married to Destinee Jordan and they have three daughters together. Jordan is a Christian.

Head coaching record

References

External links
 Milwaukee profile

1979 births
Living people
American men's basketball players
Basketball coaches from Michigan
Basketball players from Michigan
Butler Bulldogs men's basketball coaches
Butler Bulldogs men's basketball players
Educators from Michigan
Guards (basketball)
Huntsville Flight players
Iowa Hawkeyes men's basketball coaches
Michigan Wolverines men's basketball coaches
Milwaukee Panthers men's basketball coaches
People from Albion, Michigan